The Cave of Haxhi Ali is a karst cave formed in limestone cliffs in southwestern Albania, located in the Karaburun Peninsula near the Cape of Gjuhëz in Vlorë County. The cave was named after Haxhi Aliu, a prominent Albanian warrior and sailor from Ulcinj who fled with his son in this cave. Several archaeological objects has been found, that prove that this cave was used by traders and passers during the ancient times.

Despite its strategic location on the Karaburun Peninsula within the Albanian Riviera it is regarded as one of the country's most beautiful caves and attracts numerous visitors. Notably it has been recognised as a natural monument of national importance by the Ministry of Environment and is part of the Karaburun-Sazan Marine Park.

See also  
 Geography of Albania
 Protected areas of Albania 
 Karaburun-Sazan Marine Park
 Albanian piracy

References 

 

Karaburun-Sazan Marine Park
Caves of Albania
Vlorë County
Geography of Vlorë County
Tourist attractions in Vlorë County
Albanian Ionian Sea Coast